Hassi Fehal  (also written Hassi Lefhal) is a town and commune in Mansoura District, Ghardaïa Province, Algeria. According to the 2008 census it has a population of 3,651, up from 2,164 in 1998, and a growth rate of 5.5%, the highest in the province.

Transportation 

Hassi Fehal lies on the Trans-Sahara Highway just south of Mansoura, between Ghardaïa to the north and El Goléa to the south.

Education 

4.0% of the population has a tertiary education, and another 15.3% has completed secondary education. The overall literacy rate is 68.0%, and is 72.4% among males and 63.2% among females, all three figures being the lowest for any commune in the province.

Localities 
The commune of Hassi Fehal is composed of one locality:

 Centre de Hassi Lefhal

References 

Neighbouring towns and cities

Communes of Ghardaïa Province
Ghardaïa Province